The Denver, South Park, and Pacific Railroad (later called the Denver, Leadville and Gunnison Railway) was a historic  narrow gauge railroad that operated in Colorado in the western United States in the late 19th century. The railroad opened up the first rail routes to a large section of the central Colorado mining district in the decades of the mineral boom. The railroad took its name from the fact that its main line from Denver ascended the Platte Canyon and traversed South Park, hence its popular name "The South Park Line." Founded in 1872 by Colorado Governor John Evans, the company was purchased by the Union Pacific Railway in 1880, though it continued to be operated independently. The line went bankrupt in 1889 and was reorganized under a new corporate name as the Denver, Leadville and Gunnison Railway. When the Union Pacific went bankrupt in 1893, the DL&G lines went into receivership and were eventually sold to the Colorado and Southern Railway. In the first half of the 20th century, nearly all the company's original lines were dismantled or converted into . The last train to run the old DSP&P tracks was from Como, Colorado on April 11, 1937. A section of the standard gauge line between Leadville and Climax is still operated as a passenger excursion railroad called the Leadville, Colorado and Southern Railroad. At its peak the Denver, South Park and Pacific Railroad had  of narrow gauge line, making it the largest narrow gauge railroad in the state of Colorado.

Description of lines

The company's main line was  narrow gauge and went from Union Station in Denver up the valley of the South Platte River to the town of South Platte, then followed the North Fork of the South Platte through Buffalo Creek and Bailey. West of Bailey the route along North Fork and through the north end of the Tarryall Mountains essentially followed the route of present-day U.S. Highway 285 to Como, where it branched northward (see below). From Como the main line traversed South Park to Garo, where a spur went northward to Fairplay and Alma. The main line continued south over Trout Creek Pass. On the western side of the pass, a small spur of the main connected to Buena Vista, then traversed the southern end of the Sawatch Range through the Alpine Tunnel to Pitkin and Gunnison.

A principal branch of the main line north from Como went over Boreas Pass to Breckenridge, Dillon, Keystone, Frisco and Climax. This branch terminated at Leadville.

History

The company was incorporated in the Colorado Territory as the "Denver, South Park and Pacific Railway" on October 2, 1872 with 2.5 million dollars in capital. Less than a year later, on June 16, 1873, it was reorganized by John Evans as the "Denver, South Park and Pacific Railroad" with an increased capitalization of 3.5 million dollars. Construction from Denver to Morrison began in August, 1873, by the Denver Railway Association, following approval by Arapahoe county voters who passed a $300,000 bond issue. On June 20, 1874, the tracks reached Morrison, and on July 3, scheduled service began between Denver and Morrison, with two 2 round-trip mixed trains per day. This branch would provide a healthy income from the start, shipping stone, lumber, and coal from Mt. Carbon. However, the financial panic in 1873, precipitated by Jay Cooke & Co. of Philadelphia (financiers of the Northern Pacific Railroad), caused a reduction in traffic, resulting in reduced construction until 1876. During this period, the Denver, South Park and Pacific Railroad struggled to remain solvent.

The tracks reached the mouth of the Platte Canyon on May 4, 1878,  from Denver, and by June 2, the tracks reached  up the canyon. The tracks reached Buffalo Creek on June 17. The following year, on May 19, 1879, the tracks reached to the summit of Kenosha Pass and on June 27 they reached Como.

The railroad was earning about $1,200 a day, with only a daily operating expense of $480. This made the railroad very profitable, while also allowing a steady flow of money to help with construction cost. In November 1879, with the tracks only as far as South Park, the company contracted for the initial construction of the Alpine Tunnel, with an expected finish date of July 1, 1880.  The following month, the tracks reached to the summit of Trout Creek Pass.

Leadville mining boom

A mining boom near Leadville resulted in a construction race between Denver, South Park and Pacific and
Denver and Rio Grande Railroad, with both reaching Buena Vista in early 1880. The Denver, South Park and Pacific completed construction first, but rather than both companies laying track to Leadville, Jay Gould pressured the two companies to make a deal called the "Joint Operation Agreement" of October 1, 1879. The companies agree that "...for the purpose of harmony and mutual profit...", the Denver and Rio Grande would lay tracks to the north from Buena Vista to the Leadville mining district, but that the Denver, South Park and Pacific would share equal traffic rights. Similarly, the Denver, South Park and Pacific would build into the Gunnison Country via Chalk Creek, with equal traffic rights given to the Denver and Rio Grande.  In 1884 the D&RG ended the Joint Agreement, which forced the DSP&P to build their own line to Leadville.  This route, the "High Line" left the original route at Como, and proceeded across Boreas Pass to Breckenridge, then across Fremont Pass to Leadville.  This route was noteworthy for crossing the Continental Divide twice (from the Atlantic side to the Pacific side at Boreas Pass, and back to the Atlantic side at Fremont Pass), and was extremely difficult to operate in winter.

The Alpine Tunnel

Meanwhile, construction continued from Buena Vista past Mount Princeton to what would become the Alpine Tunnel. The Alpine Tunnel was "holed through" on July 26, 1881. Location of the tunnel portals and establishing a center line of the bore were completed in December 1879. Construction of the Alpine Tunnel took place between 1880–1881, by Cummings & Co. Construction company. This was the highest and most expensive tunnel built up until that time. It is  under Altman Pass, later to be named Alpine Pass to prevent confusion, with a  bore. It took 18 months to complete, with most of the construction done during the winter months. The tunnel only had a thirty-year life span, with the last locomotive passing through the tunnel on November 10, 1910.

The line exited the west portal of the Alpine Tunnel, to Alpine Tunnel Station, the highest railroad station in the United States. There also was a turntable, water tank, and a two-story frame boarding house that replaced the stone boarding house and engine house, which burned down in 1906. Parlin, located at milepost 189.78 is where the tracks of the Denver, South Park and Pacific and the Denver and Rio Grande joined up and ran along each other to Gunnison. The land for the track was given to the railroad by local dairy rancher John Parlin around 1877, with the condition that the railroad would build a depot, and stop for at least five minutes so passengers could buy milk. The main line reached Gunnison the following year in 1882.

After reaching Gunnison

The Denver, South Park, & Pacific built north of Gunnison up the Ohio Creek Drainage to the Castelton and Baldwin Areas.  Then planning to cross over Kebler Pass to Delta, Grand Junction, and points west and south.  Track was laid  past the Baldwin Mine, and another  were graded, but after losing rights of way to Lake City and the San Juan Mining District, no more construction would be done west.

The railroad went into receivership in May 1888. On July 17, 1889, the company was sold at foreclosure proceedings to the Denver, Leadville and Gunnison Railway, a new railroad which was formed to operate the DSP&P lines. The successor company went into receivership on August 4, 1894. The Colorado and Southern Railway, chartered in 1898, took over the former DSP&P lines in January 1899. The Colorado and Southern started dismantling in 1910 with the closure of the Alpine Tunnel.  In 1930, the C&S attempted to shut down the main line through the Platte Canyon, in cooperation with the Denver Board of Water Commissioners, who desired to build a dam in the canyon (See Waterton Canyon, CO). Nevertheless, the construction of modern roads in the Rockies led to a decrease in revenue and traffic. The last freight and passenger trains between Denver and Leadville operated in April 1937, and on April 10, 1937, the South Park Line officially closed down. The last regular freight train operated between Denver and Como on April 25. The last  narrow gauge section, between Leadville and Climax, was converted to standard gauge on August 25, 1943.

Locomotives 
For a complete roster visit: https://utahrails.net/up/denver-south-park-locos.php

Mason Bogies 
The Denver, South Park & Pacific owned twenty-three Mason Bogies built between 1875 and 1880 by the Mason Machine Works. Four of these engines were 2-8-6t wheel arrangement all built in 1880. They are the only known locomotive of that type ever built.

Remaining Locomotives
There are two locomotives that still exist from the original Denver, South Park and Pacific Railroad:

#51, a  built in 1880 by Baldwin Locomotive Works.  #51 was renumbered in 1885 to #191 and still bears this number, currently residing at the Colorado Railroad Museum in Golden, Colorado, on static display.  #191 is the oldest remaining authentic Colorado locomotive in the state.

#72, a  built in 1884 by Cooke Locomotive Works.  #72 was renumbered by the Colorado & Southern Railroad as their #9, and has been restored for operation in Breckenridge, Colorado. Currently on display at the Rotary Snowplow Park in Breckenridge.

Note: The locomotive at South Park City is not an authentic D,SP&PRR locomotive. It is a  narrow gauge locomotive built by H.K. Porter, Inc. in 1914 for a railroad in Guatemala. The Como roundhouse locomotive (Klondike Kate #4) is a 1912 2-6-2 by Baldwin Locomotive Works manufactured for the Klondike Mines Railway. It also is not an historic D,SP&PRR locomotive, having waited until 2017 to run on South Park track.

References

Further reading

External links

A Mason locomotive used by the DSP&P
Railwayeng.com: Denver, South Park and Pacific Railroad
Narrowgauge.org: Denver, South Park and Pacific map with links to old photos
Denver Public Library Digital Collections photos of the Denver, South Park and Pacific
The curse of Alpine: Ill conceived and ill fated, Alpine Tunnel only served for twenty-eight years (off and on)
South Park Rail Society
Historic American Engineering Record (HAER) documentation:

 
Defunct Colorado railroads
3 ft gauge railways in the United States
Narrow gauge railroads in Colorado
Predecessors of the Colorado and Southern Railway
Railway companies established in 1873
Railway companies disestablished in 1889